Bridgeport, Oregon may refer to:
 Bridgeport, Baker County, Oregon
 Bridgeport, Polk County, Oregon